The 1987 European Parliament election in Spain was held on Wednesday, 10 June 1987, to elect the MEP delegation from the country for the 2nd European Parliament. All 60 seats allocated to Spain as per the 1985 Treaty of Accession were up for election. The election was held simultaneously with regional elections in thirteen autonomous communities and local elections all throughout Spain.

Spain had acceded the European Communities on 1 January 1986 and had been represented in the European Parliament by 60 temporarily-appointed delegates until a proper election could be held. As a European-wide election was due in 1989, elected MEPs only served for the remainder of the European Parliament term.

Overview

Background
The ruling Spanish Socialist Workers' Party (PSOE) designated former Foreign Affairs Minister Fernando Morán to lead their campaign. The main opposition People's Alliance party (AP), running on its own after the People's Democratic Party (PDP) and Liberal Party (PL) broke away from the People's Coalition, chose Manuel Fraga—who had resigned as party leader in December 1986—to lead the party list. Adolfo Suárez had considered running as main candidate for his Democratic and Social Centre party (CDS), but declined after the electoral law was amended by the ruling Spanish Socialist Workers' Party to make elected MEPs incompatible for posts in the Cortes Generales—Suárez was deputy in the Congress of Deputies, and would have been forced to renounce one of the two offices if elected—.

Electoral system
The 60 members of the European Parliament allocated to Spain as per the 1985 Treaty of Accession were elected using the D'Hondt method and a closed list proportional representation, with no electoral threshold being applied in order to be entitled to enter seat distribution. However, the use of the D'Hondt method might result in an effective threshold depending on the district magnitude. Seats were allocated to a single multi-member constituency comprising the entire national territory. Voting was on the basis of universal suffrage, which comprised all nationals over 18 years of age and in full enjoyment of their political rights.

The electoral law provided that parties, federations, coalitions and groupings of electors were allowed to present lists of candidates. However, they were required to secure the signature of at least 15,000 registered electors. Electors were barred from signing for more than one list of candidates. Parties, federations and coalitions were allowed to replace this requirement with the signature of at least 50 elected officials—deputies, senators, MEPs or members from the legislative assemblies of autonomous communities or from local city councils—. Concurrently, parties and federations intending to enter in coalition to take part jointly at an election were required to inform the relevant Electoral Commission within ten days from the election call.

Parties and coalitions
Below is a list of the main parties and coalitions which contested the election:

Opinion polls
The table below lists voting intention estimates in reverse chronological order, showing the most recent first and using the dates when the survey fieldwork was done, as opposed to the date of publication. Where the fieldwork dates are unknown, the date of publication is given instead. The highest percentage figure in each polling survey is displayed with its background shaded in the leading party's colour. If a tie ensues, this is applied to the figures with the highest percentages. The "Lead" column on the right shows the percentage-point difference between the parties with the highest percentages in a given poll. When available, seat projections are also displayed below the voting estimates in a smaller font.

Results

Overall

Distribution by European group

Notes

References
Opinion poll sources

Other

External links
European elections Spain in Europe Politique.

Spain
1987
European Parliament
June 1987 events in Europe